Inland Revenue or Inland Revenue Department (IRD) is the public service department of New Zealand charged with advising the government on tax policy, collecting and disbursing payments for social support programmes, and collecting tax.

Inland Revenue's Māori name is an older spelling of Te Tari Tāke, meaning 'The Department [of] Tax'. Despite long vowels in Māori now being expressed with macrons over the vowel rather than double vowels, the department continues to use the double vowel due to the resemblance of the word tāke to the English word take.

History 
Inland Revenue started out as the Land Tax Department in 1878. The department was renamed the Land and Income Tax Department in 1892 with the central office set up in Wellington.

Only in 1952, when the organisation joined with the Stamp Duties Department, was the organisation known as the Inland Revenue Department.

In 1995, a Rewrite Advisory Panel was established to consider and advise on issues arising during the rewriting of the income tax legislation, as part of New Zealand tax reform arising from the Working Party on the Reorganisation of the Income Tax Act 1976. The panel was disestablished in 2014 at the completion of the tax reform.

Service delivery
In 2021-22, Inland Revenue collected $100.6 billion in tax revenue,  which helped pay for the services that all New Zealanders benefit from such as social security and welfare, health and education. Other services included law and order, housing and community development, environmental protection, defence, transport, and heritage, culture and recreation. 

In recent years, Inland Revenue has undergone business transformation activities aimed at simplifying the tax and social benefits process of receiving and paying taxes. As of 2019, these changes have resulted in a reduction of $60 million in administrative costs and an increase of $90 million in additional revenue through compliance and reduced effort for small to medium-sized businesses.  In 2021, further business transformation activities were undertaken, including an upgrade to myIR, their secure online service, which has made it easier for customers to manage their tax and payments online.

In 2020, Inland Revenue delivered a change to the revenue system for individuals where every taxpayer account for income tax, Working for Families, KiwiSaver, student loans and the end-to-end processing of PAYE moved into Inland Revenue’s new tax and revenue technology system.

The department administers the following social support programmes: 
 Working for Families (tax credits)
 Paid Parental Leave (payment)
 Child Support (collection and payment)
 Student Loan debt (collection)
 KiwiSaver

Acts and regulations administered
Legislation administered by Inland Revenue includes:
 Cheque Duty Repeal Act 2014 
 Child Support Act 1991
 Estate and Gift Duties Act 1968
 Gaming Duties Act 1971
 Goods and Services Tax Act 1985
 Income Tax Act 2007
 Stamp and Cheque Duties Act 1971
 Student Loan Scheme Act 2011
 Tax Administration Act 1994
 Taxation Review Authorities Act 1994
 Unclaimed Money Act 1971
 KiwiSaver Act 2006

Criticisms 

Inland Revenue has been criticised for what are seen as heavy handed tactics when forcing payment from debtors, specifically those owing tax arrears and child support payments, and for charging excessive penalties on debts which result in debtors falling into a cycle whereby they are unable to pay the growing amounts they owe. The approach of Inland Revenue has been implicated in a number of suicides and other acts of self-harm.

The number of people threatening self-harm in phone calls to Inland Revenue has trended down consistently over the last three years. Between January and August 2019, 168 people contacted Inland Revenue threatening self-harm. That compares to 292 for the 2018 calendar year; 306 for 2017; and 334 for 2016.

Awards 

 At the 2022 Public Service Day Awards, two Inland Revenue employees (one posthumously) received the Public Service Commissioner’s Commendation for Excellence award for their outstanding spirit of service.
 In 2021, Inland Revenue were finalists at the Spirit of Service Awards for service excellence for their work investing in new technology and tools, focusing on simplifying policies and processes and introducing new ways of working to deliver better experiences for customers.
 In November 2019, an Inland Revenue employee was awarded the State Services Commissioner’s Commendation for Frontline Excellence for her investigation into the suspected multimillion-dollar income suppression by a chain of restaurants. This investigation led to one of the most significant prosecution cases undertaken by Inland Revenue in the past decade.
 In 2019 Inland Revenue was awarded a Distinguished Service Award from Multicultural New Zealand in recognition of its support of community members in the aftermath of the Christchurch attacks.
 Inland Revenue, along with The Treasury, were finalists at the Spirit of Service Awards 2019 for their partnership work to enhance tax policy through kaitiakitanga (stewardship), manaakitanga (care), ōhanga (prosperity) and whanaungatanga (relationships).
 In 2019, an Inland Revenue employee was awarded the Ria McBride Public Service Management Award, sponsored by Te Kawa Mataaho Public Service Commission, which supports women to study as part of their development towards senior management positions in the Public Service. 
 In 2018, the IPANZ Prime Minister's Award for Public Sector Excellence and Achieving Collective Impact was awarded to the Ministry of Education, Tertiary Education Commission, Ministry of Social Development and Inland Revenue for delivering fees-free tertiary education for the 2018 school year. The Regulatory Systems award went to the Ministry of Justice, Department of Internal Affairs, Reserve Bank of New Zealand, Financial Markets Authority, New Zealand Customs, and Inland Revenue for Anti-Money Laundering and Countering Financing Terrorism.
 At the 2018 New Zealand CIO Awards, Inland Revenue were finalists in the Business Transformation through Digital and ICT category.

List of Ministers 
The Minister of Revenue is the political office of Minister for the department of Inland Revenue. Since November 2020, the position has been held by David Parker.

Key

See also 
Taxation in New Zealand
KiwiSaver
Working for Families

References

External links
 Official IRD website  
 Tax Policy, Inland Revenue

Revenue services
New Zealand Public Service departments
Taxation in New Zealand
Government agencies of New Zealand